Kazimieras Paltarokas (22 October 1875 in Linkuva – 3 January 1958) was a Lithuanian clergyman and bishop for the Roman Catholic Diocese of Panevėžys. He was ordained in 1902. He was appointed bishop in 1926. He died in 1958. He was an active book smuggler of the Lithuanian language literature during the Lithuanian press ban.

References 

1875 births
1958 deaths
Lithuanian Roman Catholic bishops
People from Pakruojis District Municipality